The Village Halloween Parade is an annual holiday parade on the night of every Halloween, in the Greenwich Village neighborhood of New York City. The parade, initiated in 1974 by Greenwich Village puppeteer and mask maker Ralph Lee, is the world's largest Halloween parade and the only major nighttime parade in the United States. The parade reports itself to have 50,000 "costumed participants" and 2 million spectators. The parade has its roots in New York's queer community.

The Village Halloween Parade has been called "New York's Carnival." The parade is largely a spontaneous event as individual marchers can just show up in costume at the starting point without registering or paying anything.  The parade's signature features include its large puppets, which are animated by hundreds of volunteers. The official parade theme each year is applied to the puppets.  In addition to the puppets, more than 50 marching bands participate each year. In addition, there are some commercial Halloween parade floats.

The official route, on Sixth Avenue from Spring Street to 16th Street in Manhattan, is 1.4 miles long (the distance from the gathering spot on Sixth Avenue from Canal Street to Spring Street adds another 0.2 miles). The parade usually starts at 7 PM and lasts for about two to three hours.

Historical timeline
In 1974, an informal parade of puppets for children was organized by Ralph Lee of the Mettawee River Theatre Company around his residence of artists in the Westbeth Artists Community. The next year, the parade went from Jane Street at the Hudson River to Washington Square Park.  About 200 adults and children participated. The 1975 parade was produced by the Theatre for the New City (which at the time was in Westbeth).  Lee and the Theatre won Obie Award for the production.  The 1975 parade grew to 1,500 participants.  The new management introduced more adult elements into the event including a Halloween ball after the parade. Organization of the parade was formally handled by a non-profit organization starting in 1976.

In 1977, the route was changed to 10th Street between Greenwich Avenue to Fifth Avenue and still ending in Washington Square.  A devil sat at the top of the Washington Square arch where it released balloons and slid down a wire into the fountain.  The year also saw the first appearance of giant spider on the Jefferson Market Library. The parade continued to start at Westbeth until 1983. Two years later, with crowds expanding to 250,000, the route was moved from side streets to Sixth Avenue from Spring Street to 22nd Street (although in practice the gathering point was further south at Canal Street and the northern point would be shortened to 16th Street.  The change in route ended the connection to Washington Square Park. Jeanne Fleming took over managing the event.  The change with its barricades also reduced the possibilities of people joining the parade at any point as had been the case.

In 1990, New York University and Manhattan Community Board 2 begin hosting an unrelated Children's Halloween Parade in Greenwich Village in the afternoons in Washington Square. Sophia Michahelles and Alex Kahn become the official designers of the parade's puppets in 1998, and the following year, Basil Twist designed the spider that currently appears on the Jefferson Market Library.

Less than seven weeks after the September 11 attacks in 2001, the parade was broadcast worldwide and was an indication that New York was bouncing back.  The parade was led by a giant puppet of a Phoenix rising out of the ashes.  Noticeably missing from the parade was Bread and Puppet Theater which had been a political staple of the parade but was protesting the new War in Afghanistan. Earlier the Bread and Puppet contingent consisted of five blocks of its giant puppets. Similarly, less than 8 weeks after Hurricane Katrina in 2005, more than 8,000 storm evacuees attended a funeral procession tribute as part of the parade. In 2010, Haitian Carnival Artist Didier Civil created Haitian carnival figures as a tribute to victims of the 2010 Haiti earthquake.

The parade was cancelled for the first time in the aftermath of Hurricane Sandy in 2012, which had heavily damaged coastal New York City and had left Greenwich Village without electricity during the parade time. The next year, a Kickstarter campaign to cover costs of the 2012 closing saved the parade from permanently closing. The campaign raised $56,000, surpassing its goal of $50,000.

Less than four hours after eight people were killed six blocks west of the parade route in the 2017 New York City truck attack, the parade proceeded as scheduled. Both Mayor Bill de Blasio and Gov. Andrew Cuomo marched in the parade.

In 2020, during the COVID-19 pandemic in New York City, the parade was canceled for the first time in eight years. The parade's organizers cited concerns that social distancing would be impossible with the high crowds that the parade typically saw.

Theme
In 2001, the parade presented a work of puppetry that would become celebrated for its artistry, and remembered in the city's history. After the September 11, 2001 attacks, events citywide and nationwide were being either scrapped or postponed. Organizers believed the parade would give the city a much-needed emotional release, reform the community, and help it to begin the healing process. They felt that this was the most positive way they, as artists, could serve the city at such a desperate time. "This is the meaning of the Dancing Skeletons that always lead the march: they know better than anyone what they have lost, and so they dance this one night of the year to celebrate life," Fleming told CNN in an interview.

By September 15, Fleming had scrapped the old theme and chosen a new one. Although no one was certain the parade would take place, designer Sophia Michahelles conceived of a new theme, Phoenix Rising, to galvanize the spirit of New York in the wake of the tragedy.  A giant puppet of a phoenix, the mythical bird that rises up out of its own ashes, was created by Michahelles in the workshop of Official Parade Puppeteers Superior Concept Monsters. The animated creation was mechanically configured to spread its wings and rise out of fiery ashes, represented by flickering lanterns lifted on poles, encircling the parading figure. On October 25 the parade received final authorization to go ahead. In light of the widely established community relationships which Fleming had cultivated, and the parade's long tradition, Mayor Rudy Giuliani insisted it go on.

Cultural impact
The parade has been studied by leading cultural anthropologists. According to The New York Times, "the Halloween Parade is the best entertainment the people of this City ever give the people of this City." "Absolutely anything goes," says USA Today. "Be prepared to drop your jaw."

The parade is also themed in the video game Tycoon City: New York, published in 2006.

Gallery

References

Other sources

Videos
 Karl Gober
 
 2000 Halloween Parade "Life Cycle of a Parade"Note: Each chapter is about one minute long  Note: Twin Towers in background on their last Halloween
 
 
 
 
 

 
 
 
 
 
 
 Superior Concept Monsters — Theme Performances
 
 
 
 
 
  Street photo montage, Kenneth Akama

Photographs
 
 
  NYCfoto — 2014, 2013, 2011, 2010, 2009, 2008

External links 

 
 Superior Concept Monsters, "Official" Puppeteers for New York's Village Halloween Parade
 
 
 
 
 

Halloween
Halloween events in the United States
Greenwich Village
Sixth Avenue
1973 establishments in New York City
Recurring events established in 1973